AGA AB, previously AB Gasaccumulator and AB Svenska Gasaccumulator, was a Swedish industrial gas company founded in 1904. Nobel Prize laureate Gustaf Dalén was instrumental in the success of the company. Important inventions included the AGA cooker and the Dalén light.  In the 1990s AGA conceived and developed HiQ for specialty gases.  In 2000, AGA was integrated into Linde AG.

References

External links 
 
 
 Linde Gas
 HiQ Specialty Gases from AGA and The Linde Group

Defunct companies of Sweden
Linde plc